Toy Soldiers: Cold War is an action strategy video game, developed by Signal Studios. It is the sequel to Toy Soldiers. Toy Soldiers: Cold War features 1980s-era military technology, and is based around the idea of military aggression escalating between the United States and the USSR. Toy Soldiers: Cold War features a blend of third-person action and strategy, similar to the original Toy Soldiers, but with added features and gameplay mechanics.

Gameplay

Toy Soldiers: Cold War features similar gameplay to the original game, with players trying to repel a Soviet invasion across a diorama towards a toybox in a child's bedroom. Compared to the original game which featured generic World War I battlefields, diorama settings range from jungles and deserts to real world locations such as the streets of Paris and the Great Pyramids.

The game features boss levels with certain large enemies, such as the Antonov winged tank, the Typhoon-class submarine and the final boss, the Russian project R.I.S.E and a number of changes and additions to the gameplay. For example, while players are still able to control vehicles such as tanks or helicopter gunships on the battlefield, time using these vehicles is limited by a battery charge which can be replenished either by collecting floating battery icons or returning the vehicle to its recharge stand. In addition, killstreaks are rewarded with special one-time attacks called "Barrages", which include being given the ability to call an airstrike or control an invincible Rambo-inspired commando for a limited time.

Reception

Pre-release
The announcement of Toy Soldiers: Cold War was made on March 9, 2011, as a lead up to its first public showing at the 2011 PAX East convention in Boston, Massachusetts. Jordan Devore of Destructoid said, "Way to set the bar high, Signal Studios." and Stephen Totilo of Kotaku's reaction was that, "It looks like a fantastic upgrade."

Toy Soldiers: Cold War made another showing at the 2011 E3 Convention to a positive reception. Along with its inclusion into the Xbox Live 2011 Summer of Arcade promotion,  Toy Soldiers: Cold War playable demos were hosted on the show floor. For the event, Signal Studios developed and released a new trailer for the game while also being featured in the Summer of Arcade promotional video. Talking about the barrage types, Arthur Gies of IGN said, "the show-stealer was The Commando. The Commando is, simply put, John Rambo, a John Rambo that carries a machine gun in one hand and a bazooka in the other, a John Rambo who screams things like "You wanted a war!"

Early reviews were generally positive ahead of release. Both IGN and GameSpot awarded the game 8.5/10, while Eurogamer gave a 7/10, citing that while it was a definite improvement over its predecessor, "it can't survive more than a few days of intense play".

Post-release
Toy Soldiers: Cold War released on Xbox Live on August 17, 2011, and was welcomed with high praise from critics and gamers alike, earning perfect scores from GamePro (5/5 "This fantastic sequel is everything one might want in a tower defense game, and then some.") and SFX-360 (10/10).

The game also earned high marks from Joystiq (4/5), Giant Bomb (4/5), G4TV (4/5), GameZone (9/10), Destructoid (8.5/10 "a very well-rounded and big package of content that goes beyond what other games in this price-range tend to offer.") GameShark (A-), and Game Revolution (A- ". It's an extremely thrilling, rip-roaring game and extremely rewarding.").

"Toy Soldier: Cold War immediately tapped into my inner child with its colorful and explosive action and is sure to dazzle real-time strategists, model makers and lovers of vintage weapons in the family." – The Washington Times 

"Toy Soldiers: Cold War mixes just the right amount of humor, strategy and player control to prove fairly addictive." –TIME 

"Signal Studios took what was already a great game and made it even better" – Gamecritics.com 

As of year-end 2011 sales exceeded 248,000 units.

References

External links

 

2011 video games
Action video games
Cold War video games
Helicopter video games
Microsoft games
Strategy video games
Tank simulation video games
Tower defense video games
Video games about toys
Video games developed in the United States
Video game sequels
Xbox 360 Live Arcade games
Xbox 360 games
Windows games
Windows Phone games
Multiplayer and single-player video games